Stelian Marin (born 6 March 1950) is a Romanian footballer who played as a midfielder.

Honours

Player
Rapid București
Divizia B: 1974–75
Cupa României: 1971–72, 1974–75

Notes

References

External links
Stelian Marin at Labtof.ro

1950 births
Living people
Romanian footballers
Association football midfielders
Liga I players
Liga II players
FC Rapid București players
Footballers from Bucharest